Régine Chopinot (born 1952), born at Fort-de-l'Eau (nowadays Bordj El Kiffan) in Algeria, is a French dancer and choreographer of Contemporary Dance.

History 
Since she was 5 years old, Régine Chopinot studied classical dance, and then discovered, in 1974, Contemporary Dance with Marie Zighera.
She will later teach at Croix-Rousse in Lyon (Véronique Ros de la Grange was one of her students) . In 1978, she founded her own company, in association with dancers, actors and musicians. She then signed her first choreographies.

Her creations, Délices et Via, will introduce multimedia and cinema in the dance world and use new lighting techniques. For Délices in 1983, Régine Chopinot met Jean-Paul Gaultier, a French tailor. Both artists will keep working together for 10 years, for Le Défilé (1985), K.O.K. (1988), Ana (1990) St Georges (1991) et Façade (1993).

References

1952 births
Living people